School No. 1 is a school located in Gagarinsky District, South-Western Administrative Okrug, Moscow.

External links
 

Schools in Moscow